Kansas City 7 is a 1980 studio album by Count Basie.

Track listing
"Jaylock" (Count Basie, Eddie "Lockjaw" Davis, Freddie Hubbard, Joe Pass) – 7:17
"Exactly Like You" (Dorothy Fields, Jimmy McHugh) – 8:00
"I'll Always Be in Love With You" (Bud Green, Herman Ruby, Sam Stept) – 7:29
"If I Could Be with You (One Hour Tonight)" (Henry Creamer, James P. Johnson) – 6:20
"Honi Coles" (Basie, Davis, Hubbard, J. J. Johnson) – 6:48
"Blues for Norman" (Basie, Davis, Hubbard, J. J. Johnson) – 8:51
"Count Me In" (Basie) – 9:12

Personnel
 Count Basie - piano
 Eddie "Lockjaw" Davis - tenor saxophone
 J. J. Johnson - trombone
 Freddie Hubbard - trumpet
 Joe Pass - guitar
 John Heard - double bass
 Jake Hanna - drums

References

1980 albums
Count Basie albums
Pablo Records albums
Albums produced by Norman Granz